"XXX" (stylized as "XXX.", pronounced "X-Rated") is a song by American rapper Kendrick Lamar, from his fourth studio album Damn, released on April 14, 2017. The eleventh track on the album (fourth on the Collector's Edition of Damn), the song was written by Lamar, Mike Will Made It, DJ Dahi, Mark Spears  Sounwave, Anthony Tiffith, Bono, the Edge, Adam Clayton, and Larry Mullen Jr., and produced by Mike Will Made It, DJ Dahi, and Sounwave, with additional production by Top Dawg and Bēkon. The song features samples of the songs "America" by Bēkon and "American Soul" by Irish rock band U2. Although not released as a single, the song charted in multiple countries in 2017. These countries include Ireland, New Zealand, United States of America, Canada, United Kingdom, and Sweden. Though it only appeared for 1 week for the New Zealand, Sweden, and United Kingdom charts, it stayed for 3 weeks on Ireland and United States charts, and remained on the Canada music charts for 4 weeks. The highest the song ever reached on any country's primary music chart was at number 22 in Ireland.

Composition 
The lyrics of "XXX" are about speaking truth to power. Some of its primary themes include violence, revenge, as well as the effect of those themes upon the political system in the United States of America. The first verse has Lamar talking about what he would do if anything happened to his family. The chorus then features Bono, the lead singer of Irish rock band U2, singing a prominent refrain in the latter half of the song. Lamar also references then-current U.S. President Donald Trump and former President Barack Obama in the lyric, "Donald Trump's in office; we lost Barack, and promised to never doubt him again". The song also features religious references in multiple lyrics, including "throw a steak off the ark to a pool full of sharks" to reference the common biblical story of Noah's Ark.  As well, he states "K-Dot can you pray for me?" and "I know that you anointed, show me how to overcome" within one verse to showcase himself as one who acts in the Lord's favor. The song also features lines mentioning a character of "Johnny," much like his 2011 track "Little Johnny," about a boy who falls privy to gang culture.

Critical reception 
"XXX" received widespread acclaim from music critics. Ian Servantes of Spin called the song "damn good." Steven Hyden of Uproxx said that U2's cameo was "very un-U2-like" but in a good way. 

Journalist Alexis Rhiannon of Bustle states that there is a "whole lot to absorb" within the lyrics of the song. She cites how the use of Juxtaposition between U2's interludes and Lamar's own verses makes Lamar's statements in the song about "his loss of faith in the system" able to be understood. Rhiannon also complimented Lamar's vocal performance in the song, stating "the fire in his voice points out how the American experience differs wildly from individual to individual." 

The Diamondback news source paid compliments to the track, commending its messaging and stating "he’s [Lamar] fed up with violence and gun politics, but in the same breath threatens to pick off those who challenge him." The Diamondback also spoke further on the theming of the song, stating that Lamar "wrestles with the meaning of perfection" within this track.

Reggie Ugwu of Buzzfeed News examined "XXX" as a whole track, stating that the song is a "hard-hitting, shapeshifting elegy" in how it relays its messages.

Live performances 
Lamar performed "XXX" live, without U2, at the Coachella Valley Music and Arts Festival on April 23, 2017. Lamar has performed "XXX" on the Damn tour. Lamar performed "XXX" live with U2 and Dave Chappelle at the 60th Annual Grammy Awards in January 2018, with Chapelle offering a brief interlude to be mixed into the live song. Lamar and U2 performed an excerpt before transferring into a verse from "DNA". Lamar also mixed two other songs into his performance, including "New Freezer," a feature Lamar did with Rich the Kid, as well as an excerpt from his song "King's Dead" from the "Black Panther Soundtrack." Lamar utilized a visual screen in the performance to state "THIS IS A SATIRE BY KENDRICK LAMAR." Lamar also performed XXX with assistance of a visual backdrop at the 2018 Reading Festival.

Credits and personnel 

Credits adapted from the official Damn digital booklet.
Kendrick Duckworth – songwriter, additional keys
Mike Will Made It – songwriter, producer
Dacoury Natche – songwriter, producer
Mark Spears – songwriter, producer
Anthony "Topdawg" Tiffith – songwriter, producer
Paul Hewson – songwriter, voice
David Evans – songwriter
Adam Clayton – songwriter
Larry Mullen Jr. – songwriter
Bēkon – additional production and vocals
Kid Capri – additional vocals
Derek Ali – mixing
Tyler Page – mix assistant
Cyrus Taghipour – mix assistant
Zeke Mishanic – additional recording
Brendan Silas Perry – additional recording

Charts

Certifications

References

2017 songs
Kendrick Lamar songs
Songs about Donald Trump
Songs written by Kendrick Lamar
Songs written by Mike Will Made It
Songs written by Bono
Songs written by the Edge
Songs written by Adam Clayton
Songs written by Larry Mullen Jr.
Song recordings produced by Mike Will Made It
Songs written by DJ Dahi
Songs written by Sounwave